Ancylolomia intricata, the Intricate grass-moth is a moth in the family Crambidae. It was described by Stanisław Błeszyński in 1970. It is found in India (Assam).

References

Ancylolomia
Moths described in 1970
Moths of Asia